Anna Tõrvand-Tellmann (sometimes written as Tellman; 28 July 1886 - 23 August 1953 Molotovsk, Perm Oblast) was an Estonian politician. She was a member of Estonian Constituent Assembly. She was a member of the assembly since 7 October 1919. She replaced Mihkel Varrik.

References

1886 births
1953 deaths
Members of the Estonian Constituent Assembly